R. Keao NeSmith is a Native Hawaiian linguist, educator, and translator. He has taught at various universities, such as the University of Hawai‘i at Hilo, l'Université de la Polynésie française in ‘Outumaoro, Tahiti, the University of Waikato in Hamilton, New Zealand, and the University of Hawai‘i at Mānoa in Honolulu, Hawai‘i. He has taught Hawaiian language, Hawaiian Studies, subjects on endangered language revitalization, and Tahitian language.

His work on "Neo Hawaiian" as a separate variety of Hawaiian has informed debate in Hawaiian language studies, as well as broader issues in language revitalization.

He has translated a number of books into Hawaiian, including The Hobbit, The Little Prince, Alice's Adventures in Wonderland, and the Harry Potter series. He is currently working on a Hawaiian translation of The Chronicles of Narnia.

References 

Indigenous linguists
Native Hawaiian people
Year of birth missing (living people)
Living people